Francisco de Paula Mellado was a Spanish geographer, journalist, writer and editor who published the Enciclopedia moderna between 1851 and 1855.

Works
Aventuras extraordinarias de los viageros célebre, Madrid, 1850.
Diccionario de artes y manufacturas..., Madrid: Est. Tip. de Mellado, 1856–57, 4 vol.
Diccionario universal de historia y geografía, Madrid: Est. Tip. de Francisco de Paula Mellado, 1846–50, 8 vol.
España geográfica, histórica, estadística y pintoresca:..., Madrid: Mellado: Gabinete literario, 1845, 946 pág.
Guía del viajero de España, Madrid: Est. Tipogr., 1846.
Recuerdos de un viaje por España, Madrid: Vieja España, 1975, 3 vol.
Others

References

Bibliography 

La obra de Francisco de Paula Mellado, fecundo y ejemplar impresor en el Romanticismo / María del Carmen de Artigas Sanz, Revista de archivos, bibliotecas y museos de Madrid, T. 73, nº 1, 1966.

Spanish editors